Theodotos Kalothetos was a senior official and governor in the Empire of Nicaea.

Little is known about his life. He was a native of Ephesus, and an uncle to the future emperor Michael VIII Palaiologos. He held the high military post of Domestic of the Schools in the early 1250s, but was derided for his lack of cultivation in a letter by Emperor Theodore II Laskaris (r. 1254–58). He is attested again in 1259, when he sided with the monk Gabriel, of the monastery of St. Gregory Thaumatourgos, in his dispute with Nikephoros Blemmydes. At that time, he held the court rank of pansebastos sebastos and was governor of extensive territory in western Anatolia comprising the Thracesian Theme, Melanoudion, Pyrgion and Kaloe.

References

Sources
 
 

13th-century Byzantine people
Byzantine governors
Domestics of the Schools
People of the Empire of Nicaea
Theodotos
Ephesus
Governors of the Thracesian Theme
Sebastoi